Ataxia brunnea is a species of beetle in the family Cerambycidae. It was described by Champlain and Knull in 1926. It is known from the United States.

References

Ataxia (beetle)
Beetles described in 1926